Mikael Christian Wiehe (born 10 April 1946 in Stockholm) is a Swedish singer, multi-instrumentalist and composer. As the main songwriter and driving force of Hoola Bandoola Band he was also one of the most important people in the progg movement.

Career
Wiehe's father was Danish and he spent the first six years of his life in Copenhagen. His father left the family when Wiehe was five years old, and when he was six his mother moved with the family to Malmö, in the Scania region of southern Sweden, giving Wiehe his noticeable Scanian accent. He is a leftist folk musician, dealing with what he considers right and wrong in the society from the eyes of the proletariat, but he also writes personal, non-political songs.

Wiehe was one of the lead singers and the leading songwriter of Hoola Bandoola Band in the 1970s. After the band broke up in 1975, he was the leader of various other bands before becoming a solo artist in the early 1980s. He was a close friend of Björn Afzelius, the other lead singer of Hoola Bandoola Band. They sometimes toured around Scandinavia and recorded together in the 1980s and 1990s.

As of 2022, Wiehe performs all around Sweden, using material from his 20-some albums (excluding various compilations). A recently published song book contains the lyrics and melodies to 220 of his songs. In 2000, he released the single Det här är ditt land, a Swedish-language adaptation of the Woody Guthrie song This Land Is Your Land which received substantial play on Swedish radio. Wiehe has also translated many of Bob Dylan's songs into Swedish, some of which were performed by Totta Näslund.

60th birthday tribute
On Wiehe's 60th birthday, a tribute show was held in his hometown Malmö. A number of high-profile Swedish artists, including Joakim Thåström, Lars Winnerbäck, Dregen, Lisa Ekdahl, Timbuktu, Stefan Sundström, Idde Shultz and Anna Stadling (of Hovet), Ebba Forsberg, Thomas Wiehe and Peter Clemmendson, performed Wiehe's songs in front of approximately 20,000 people. At the end of the show, Wiehe took the stage and performed a set of his favorite songs. The concert was later broadcast on Sveriges Television with interviews and older footage of Wiehe.

Political views

On 24 February 2007, Wiehe performed at a festival in Malmö, labeled as a "solidarity party for the Cuban Revolution", which was organized by the Swedish-Cuban Association, the Revolutionary Communist Youth, the Swedish Communist Party and others. The ambassador of Cuba to Sweden, Ernesto Meléndez Bachs, also held a speech at the festival. In an interview in Kvällsposten, Wiehe said that "Cuba has the best record on human rights in the region" and in an interview with Sveriges Radio he said that he would "hesitate" to label the country as a dictatorship.

In 2015, Wiehe received the Lenin Award, controversial due to its namesake Vladimir Lenin.

Selected discography

Studio albums
Hoola Bandoola Band
 Hoola Bandoola Export (1971)
 Garanterat Individuell (1971)
 Vem Kan Man Lita På? (1972)
 På Väg (1973)
 Stoppa Matchen (1975)
 Fri information (1975)
 Ingenting Förändras Av Sig Själv – 5 cd box (1996)
 För Dom Som Kommer Sen – live (1999)

Mikael Wiehe och Kabaréorkestern
 Sjömansvisor (1978)
 Elden är Lös (1979)

Mikael Wiehe, Nyberg, Franck och Fjellis
 Gökungen (1981)
 Kråksånger (1981)
 Dom Ensligas Alle (1982)

Mikael Wiehe och Co
 Lindansaren (1983)
 Lillian Står i Hagen (1983)
 Mikael Wiehe Mitt i Sverige (1984)
 Hemingwayland (1985)

Solo work
 Mikael Wiehe (1986)
 Basin Street Blues (1988)
 1989 – live (1989)
 Allt är förändrat (1991)
 Det Ligger Döda Kameler i min Swimmingpool (1992)
 Wiehe 30 sånger – compilation (1993)
 Trollkarlen (1994)
 Sevilla (1998)
 En Sång Till Modet (2000)
 Det Här Är Ditt Land (2000)
 Kommunal 90 År 2000 (2000)
 Kärlek och Politik (2004)
 Moccers (2004)
 Främmande Land (2005)
 Sånger från en inställd skilsmässa (2009)
 En gammal man (2012)
 Isolde (2013)
 Protestsänger (2014)	
 En dubbel Dylan på Svenska (2015)	
	
Björn Afzelius och Mikael Wiehe
 Björn Afzelius och Mikael Wiehe (1986)
 Malmöinspelnigarna (2004)

Mikael Wiehe och Julio Numhauser
 Suecia – Chile (1989)
 Mikael Wiehe och Julio Numhauser (1991)

Totta och Wiehe
 Dylan (2006)

Mikael Wiehe & Ebba Forsberg
 Dylan På Svenska (2007)

Åge Aleksandersen & Mikael Wiehe
 14 Akustiska Sånger (2008)

Mikael Wiehe & Jacques Werup
 Wiehe & Werup (2008)

Compilation albums
2012: Alla dessa minnen: Det bästa med Mikael Wiehe

References

External links

Official Website

1946 births
Bonnier Amigo Music Group artists
Swedish songwriters
Swedish socialists
Swedish republicans
Musicians from Malmö
Sommar (radio program) hosts
Living people